The First Avenue Bridge is a historic structure located in downtown Cedar Rapids, Iowa, United States. The original six-span concrete arch structure was completed in 1920 for $420,000. It was designed by Marsh Engineering Company and built by Koss Construction Co., both of Des Moines. Consulting engineer Ned L. Ashton of Iowa City designed the 1960s remodel. He had all of the concrete work above the original arches torn out and the bridge rebuilt as an open-spandrel structure. The rebuild also included a wider deck to accommodate increased traffic and aluminum railings. While the bridge's original structural integrity has been compromised, this is the first notable concrete spandrel arch reconstruction in Iowa and possibly in the country. The bridge was listed on the National Register of Historic Places in 1998.

See also
 
 
 
 
 List of bridges on the National Register of Historic Places in Iowa
 National Register of Historic Places listings in Linn County, Iowa

References

Bridges completed in 1920
Buildings and structures in Cedar Rapids, Iowa
National Register of Historic Places in Cedar Rapids, Iowa
Road bridges on the National Register of Historic Places in Iowa
Bridges in Linn County, Iowa
Bridges of the United States Numbered Highway System
U.S. Route 51
1920 establishments in Iowa
Concrete bridges in the United States
Open-spandrel deck arch bridges in the United States